Rough Run is an unincorporated community in Grant County, West Virginia, United States. Its post office  is closed.

The community was named after nearby Rough Run creek.

References

Unincorporated communities in Grant County, West Virginia
Unincorporated communities in West Virginia